Events in 2012 in anime.

Year in review 
In Japanese polling, Newtypes best releases of Autumn 2011 to Summer 2012 announced the best anime series as Fate/Zero, The Idolmaster, Nisemonogatari, Tari Tari and Hyouka. For movies, the poll named only three awards for the K-On! Movie, Mahou Shoujo Lyrical Nanoha: The Movie and Wolf Children. Another series debut was Sword Art Online. Kotaku's Richard Eisenbeis praised Sword Art Online, even before the series' conclusion, for its complex and genre-crossing storyline and intelligent portrayal of sociological and psychological issues. Eisenbeis would also pick five different movies for top film of 2012, including The Wolf Children Ame and Yuki, Evangelion 3.0, Detective Conan: The Eleventh Striker, One Piece Film: Z and Doraemon: Nobita and the Island of Miracles as his top five movies.

Anime News Network's, Theron Martin and Carl Kimlinger listed the best anime in America of 2012 summarized the popular works that were widely released to American audiences. The two reviewers picked Puella Magi Madoka Magica and Anohana as series of the year with runners-up Love, Chunibyo & Other Delusions and Kimi ni Todoke. The staff's picks for best movies of the year, were The Secret World of Arrietty and Redline.

In March 2013, the Tokyo Anime Awards recognized Wolf Children for animation of the year, Sword Art Online and Kuroko's Basketball for television series of the year.

At the Mainichi Film Awards, the Animation Film Award was won by Wolf Children and the Ōfuji Noburō Award was won by Combustible. Wolf Children also won the Japan Academy Prize for Animation of the Year. Internationally, A Letter to Momo won the Asia Pacific Screen Award for Best Animated Feature Film, with three of the other four nominees being also from Japan: From Up on Poppy Hill, Niji-Iro Hotaru: Eien no Natsu Yasumi and Wolf Children.

Deaths 
March 20 - Noboru Ishiguro

Releases

Films
A list of anime that debuted in theaters between January 1 and December 31, 2012.

Television series
A list of anime television series that debuted between January 1 and December 31, 2012.

Original video animations
A list of original video animations that debuted between January 1 and December 31, 2012.

See also 
2012 in Japanese television (general)
2012 in British television
2012 in Mexican television
2012 in animation
2012 in television
2012 phenomenon

References

External links 
Japanese animated works of the year, listed in the IMDb

Years in anime
2012 in animation
2012 in Japan